Phoebe Fox (born 16 April 1987) is an English actress, who was nominated for Olivier and Evening Standard awards for work in theatre. She has appeared in
the Black Mirror episode "The Entire History of You" (2011), The Woman in Black: Angel of Death (2015), The Hollow Crown: Wars of the Roses (2016), and  The Great (2020-present).

Early life
Fox is the daughter of "jobbing actors" Stuart Fox and Prue Clarke. Fox was educated at Chiswick School 

Fox trained at the Royal Academy of Dramatic Art (RADA).

Career
In 2010, Fox made her debut acting appearance in the play A Month in the Country at the Chichester Festival Theatre. The following year she starred in As You Like It at the Rose Theatre, The Acid Test at the Royal Court Theatre upstairs and There Is A War at the National Theatre as part of their Double Feature in the Paintframe. Based on these performances she was nominated for the 2011 Evening Standard Theatre Award for Milton Shulman Award for Outstanding Newcomer.

Fox was tipped in the 2011 Screen International Stars of Tomorrow list.

In 2012, Fox appeared as Grace in Switch, a TV series about witches living in a city. In 2014 she appeared in The Musketeers as the Duchess of Savoy; in A Poet in New York as Liz Reitell, and also as Eve Perkins in The Woman in Black 2: Angel of Death.

In 2014 Fox was nominated for Laurence Olivier Award for Best Actress in a Supporting Role for her performance in A View from the Bridge at the Young Vic, alongside Mark Strong who won best actor. In 2015, Fox starred as Vanessa Bell in Life in Squares, a BBC drama about the Bloomsbury Group and in the thriller film Eye in the Sky.

In 2020, Fox starred as Marial, a main character in The Great alongside co-stars Elle Fanning and Nicholas Hoult. She was part of the ensemble nominated for Screen Actors Guild Award for Outstanding Cast in a Comedy Series.

Personal life
Fox is married to actor Kyle Soller, whom she met at RADA. They live in London.

Selected credits

Film and television

Theatre

Radio

Awards and nominations
Fox was named one of  Screen International Stars of Tomorrow in 2011.

References

External links 

1987 births
21st-century English actresses
Actresses from London
Alumni of RADA
Living people
People from Hammersmith